Smelly Old History is a series of illustrated books published by Oxford University Press. The books contain aromatic scratch and sniff panels to provide the reader with an aroma of different smells to represent the ages. The series was written by Mary J. Dobson and has sold over a million copies around the world.

Titles
The series consists of:
 Greek Grime (1998)
 Medieval Muck (1998)
 Mouldy Mummies (1998)
 Reeking Royals (1998)
 Roman Aromas (1997)
 Tudor Odours (1997)
 Victorian Vapours (1997)
 Vile Vikings (1998)
 Wartime Whiffs (1998)

There is also a 9-volume set, containing all 9 books.

References

Oxford University Press books